Kolam, also known as Muggu, Tarai Alangaram and Rangoli is a form of traditional decorative art that is drawn by using rice flour as per age-old conventions. It is also drawn using white stone powder, chalk or chalk powder, often along with natural or synthetic color powders. Its origin belongs to the ancient Tamil Nadu known as Tamilakam and has since spread to the other southern Indian states of Karnataka, Telangana, Andhra Pradesh, and Kerala. It can be found in some parts of Goa and Maharashtra. Since the Tamil diaspora is worldwide, the practice of kolam is found around the world, including in Sri Lanka, Singapore, Malaysia, Indonesia, Thailand and a few other Asian countries. A kolam or muggu is a geometrical line drawing composed of straight lines, curves and loops, drawn around a grid pattern of dots. It is widely practised by female family members in front of their house entrance, although men and boys also practice this tradition. More complex kolams are drawn and colors are often added during festival days, holiday occasions and special events.

Practice and belief

Kolams or muggulu are thought to bring prosperity to homes. In millions of households in Tamil Nadu, Telangana and Andhra Pradesh, women draw kolams in front of their home entrance every day at the break of dawn. Traditionally kolams are drawn on the flat surface of the ground with white rice flour. The drawings get walked on throughout the day, washed out in the rain, or blown around in the wind; new ones are made the next day. Each morning before sunrise, the front entrance of the house, or wherever the kolam may be drawn, is swept clean, sprinkled with water, thereby making for a flat surface. The kolams are generally drawn while the surface is still damp so the design will hold better. Instead of rice flour (/), white stone powder is occasionally used for creating Kolam; cow dung is also used to wax the floors. In some cultures, cow dung is believed to have antiseptic properties and hence provides a literal threshold of protection for the home. It also provides contrast with the white powder.

Decoration is not the main purpose of a kolam. In the olden days, kolams or muggulu were drawn in coarse rice flour so the ants would not have to walk too far or too long for a meal. The rice powder also invites birds and other small creatures to eat it, thus welcoming other beings into one's home and everyday life: a daily tribute to harmonious co-existence. It is a sign of invitation to welcome all into the home, not the least of whom is Lakshmi, the goddess of prosperity and wealth. The patterns range from geometric and mathematical line drawings around a matrix of dots to free-form artwork and closed shapes. Folklore has evolved to mandate that the lines must be completed to symbolically prevent evil spirits from entering the inside of the shapes. Thus, they are prevented from entering the inside of the home.

It used to be a matter of pride to be able to draw large complicated patterns without lifting the hand off the floor or standing up in between. The month of Mārgaḻi/Margasira was eagerly awaited by young women, who would then showcase their skills by covering the entire width of the road with one big kolam.

In the kolam patterns, many designs are derived from magical motifs and abstract designs blended with philosophical and religious motifs which have been mingled together. Motifs may include fish, birds, and other animal images to symbolise the unity of man and beast. The sun, moon and other zodiac symbols are also used.  A downward-pointing triangle represents woman; an upward-pointing triangle represents man. A circle represents nature while a square represents culture. A lotus represents the womb. A pentagram represents Venus and the five elements.

The ritual kolam patterns created for special occasions such as weddings often stretch down the street. Many of these created patterns have been passed on from generation to generation, from mothers to daughters.

Text messages like the word welcome (/) or a seasonal phrase, happy new year, can also be used in kolam/muggu. Volunteering to draw the kolam at the temple is sometimes done when a devotee's wishes are fulfilled. The art of kolam designs has found its way into the future through social networking sites like Facebook. Many kolam/muggu artists have large fan followings online and are playing a role in making the kolam art form a key part of South India's contemporary art scene.

Variants

For special occasions limestone and red brick powder for contrast are also used. Though kolams are usually made with dry rice flour (kolapodi), for longevity, dilute rice paste or even paints are also used. Modern interpretations have accommodated chalk, and more recently vinyl stickers.

Though not as flamboyant as its other Indian contemporary, rangoli, which is extremely colourful, a South Indian Kolam is all about symmetry, precision, and complexity.  Due to their complexity, trying to figure out how, exactly, these designs were drawn can be a challenge that some viewers find enjoyable.

Patterns

 a pattern in which a stroke (in Tamil) runs once around each dot, and returns to the beginning point as a mostly geometrical figure. The stroke is called  from a snakey line. The stroke has a knot-like structure.
 a pattern using only part of the dot grid. If that is the case, the same pattern or a different pattern fills/uses up the remaining dot grids. Most of the times, these patterns together end up becoming a complex pattern.
 a pattern in which a stroke runs around each dot incompletely, but open.
 a pattern in which strokes (/) are connected between the dots. Sometimes they represent kinds of objects, flowers, or animals.
 a pattern in which dots are set in a radial arrangement, called lotus.
 a pattern which is drawn freestyle and mostly coloured.

Research
 The mathematical properties of kolams are used in the computer science field. Kolam patterns are studied and algorithms have been developed for generating kolam designs with different patterns.
 Algorithms for drawing kolams are used in the development of picture-drawing computer software. 
 Kolams are used for research in computational anthropology. 
 As kolams have a strong relationship with contemporary art and art history, they are used in the art and media fields.
 Kolams are also used to simplify the representation of complex protein structures for easy understanding.

Gallery

See also
 Jhoti chita
 Vanuatu Sand drawing
 Street painting
 Kuberakolam
kolam history

References

External links
 

Tamil culture
Arts in India
Indian sandpainting
Culture of Andhra Pradesh
Culture of Tamil Nadu